Lepidoptera of Cyprus consist of both the butterflies and moths recorded from Cyprus.

Butterflies

Hesperiidae
Carcharodus alceae (Esper, 1780)
Gegenes pumilio (Hoffmannsegg, 1804)
Pelopidas thrax (Hübner, 1821)
Thymelicus acteon (Rottemburg, 1775)

Lycaenidae
Aricia agestis (Denis & Schiffermuller, 1775)
Azanus jesous (Guerin-Meneville, 1847)
Celastrina argiolus (Linnaeus, 1758)
Cigaritis acamas (Klug, 1834)
Favonius quercus (Linnaeus, 1758)
Freyeria trochylus (Freyer, 1845)
Glaucopsyche paphos Chapman, 1920
Lampides boeticus (Linnaeus, 1767)
Leptotes pirithous (Linnaeus, 1767)
Luthrodes galba (Lederer, 1855)
Lycaena phlaeas (Linnaeus, 1761)
Lycaena thersamon (Esper, 1784)
Polyommatus icarus (Rottemburg, 1775)
Pseudophilotes vicrama (Moore, 1865)
Tarucus balkanica (Freyer, 1844)
Zizeeria karsandra (Moore, 1865)

Nymphalidae
Argynnis pandora (Denis & Schiffermuller, 1775)
Charaxes jasius (Linnaeus, 1767)
Chazara briseis (Linnaeus, 1764)
Danaus chrysippus (Linnaeus, 1758)
Hipparchia syriaca (Staudinger, 1871)
Hipparchia cypriensis Holik, 1949
Hyponephele lupinus (O. Costa, 1836)
Kirinia roxelana (Cramer, 1777)
Lasiommata maera (Linnaeus, 1758)
Lasiommata megera (Linnaeus, 1767)
Libythea celtis (Laicharting, 1782)
Limenitis reducta Staudinger, 1901
Maniola cypricola (Graves, 1928)
Nymphalis polychloros (Linnaeus, 1758)
Pararge aegeria (Linnaeus, 1758)
Pseudochazara anthelea (Hübner, 1824)
Vanessa atalanta (Linnaeus, 1758)
Vanessa cardui (Linnaeus, 1758)
Ypthima asterope (Klug, 1832)

Papilionidae
Papilio machaon Linnaeus, 1758
Zerynthia cerisy (Godart, 1824)

Pieridae
Anthocharis cardamines (Linnaeus, 1758)
Aporia crataegi (Linnaeus, 1758)
Colias croceus (Fourcroy, 1785)
Euchloe ausonia (Hübner, 1804)
Gonepteryx cleopatra (Linnaeus, 1767)
Pieris brassicae (Linnaeus, 1758)
Pieris rapae (Linnaeus, 1758)
Pontia chloridice (Hübner, 1813)

Moths

Adelidae
Adela paludicolella Zeller, 1850
Nemophora minimella (Denis & Schiffermuller, 1775)

Alucitidae
Alucita klimeschi Scholz & Jackh, 1997

Autostichidae
Apatema acutivalva Gozmany, 2000
Apatema apatemella Amsel, 1958
Apatema mediopallidum Walsingham, 1900
Apiletria luella Lederer, 1855
Charadraula cassandra Gozmany, 1967
Orpecacantha aphrodite (Gozmany, 1986)
Symmoca vitiosella Zeller, 1868
Syringopais temperatella (Lederer, 1855)

Blastobasidae
Blastobasis phycidella (Zeller, 1839)
Tecmerium perplexum (Gozmany, 1957)

Carposinidae
Carposina berberidella Herrich-Schäffer, 1854
Carposina scirrhosella Herrich-Schäffer, 1854

Choreutidae
Anthophila fabriciana (Linnaeus, 1767)
Choreutis nemorana (Hübner, 1799)

Coleophoridae
Coleophora alashiae Baldizzone, 1996
Coleophora albicostella (Duponchel, 1842)
Coleophora arenbergerella Baldizzone, 1985
Coleophora bilineella Herrich-Schäffer, 1855
Coleophora granulosella Staudinger, 1880
Coleophora helianthemella Milliere, 1870
Coleophora jerusalemella Toll, 1942
Coleophora lassella Staudinger, 1859
Coleophora luteolella Staudinger, 1880
Coleophora maritimella Newman, 1863
Coleophora mausolella Chretien, 1908
Coleophora ononidella Milliere, 1879
Coleophora parthenica Meyrick, 1891
Coleophora salicorniae Heinemann & Wocke, 1877
Coleophora salinella Stainton, 1859
Coleophora semicinerea Staudinger, 1859
Coleophora tamesis Waters, 1929
Coleophora valesianella Zeller, 1849
Coleophora zernyi Toll, 1944
Goniodoma limoniella (Stainton, 1884)

Cosmopterigidae
Alloclita recisella Staudinger, 1859
Anatrachyntis simplex (Walsingham, 1891)
Ascalenia vanelloides Gerasimov, 1930
Cosmopterix coryphaea Walsingham, 1908
Cosmopterix pararufella Riedl, 1976
Eteobalea dohrnii (Zeller, 1847)
Eteobalea intermediella (Riedl, 1966)
Eteobalea sumptuosella (Lederer, 1855)
Pyroderces argyrogrammos (Zeller, 1847)
Ramphis libanoticus Riedl, 1969
Sorhagenia reconditella Riedl, 1983

Cossidae
Dyspessa ulula (Borkhausen, 1790)
Paropta l-nigrum (Bethune-Baker, 1894)
Paropta paradoxus (Herrich-Schäffer, [1851])
Zeuzera pyrina (Linnaeus, 1761)

Crambidae
Anarpia incertalis (Duponchel, 1832)
Ancylolomia chrysographellus (Kollar & Redtenbacher, 1844)
Eudonia delunella (Stainton, 1849)
Herpetogramma licarsisalis (Walker, 1859)
Metasia albicostalis Hampson, 1900
Metasia parvalis Caradja, 1916
Metasia rosealis Ragonot, 1895
Prionapteryx obeliscota (Meyrick, 1936)
Prochoristis crudalis (Lederer, 1863)
Scoparia berytella Rebel, 1911
Scoparia ingratella (Zeller, 1846)
Scoparia staudingeralis (Mabille, 1869)

Douglasiidae
Tinagma anchusella (Benander, 1936)
Tinagma klimeschi Gaedike, 1987

Elachistidae
Agonopterix cachritis (Staudinger, 1859)
Agonopterix ferulae (Zeller, 1847)
Agonopterix nodiflorella (Milliere, 1866)
Agonopterix rutana (Fabricius, 1794)
Agonopterix scopariella (Heinemann, 1870)
Depressaria daucivorella Ragonot, 1889
Depressaria depressana (Fabricius, 1775)
Elachista sutteri Kaila, 2002
Elachista pigerella (Herrich-Schäffer, 1854)
Ethmia bipunctella (Fabricius, 1775)
Exaeretia ledereri (Zeller, 1854)

Erebidae
Autophila asiatica (Staudinger, 1888)
Autophila dilucida (Hübner, 1808)
Autophila luxuriosa Zerny, 1933
Autophila anaphanes Boursin, 1940
Autophila maura (Staudinger, 1888)
Catephia alchymista (Denis & Schiffermuller, 1775)
Catocala coniuncta (Esper, 1787)
Catocala conversa (Esper, 1783)
Catocala dilecta (Hübner, 1808)
Catocala disjuncta (Geyer, 1828)
Catocala diversa (Geyer, 1828)
Catocala elocata (Esper, 1787)
Catocala eutychea Treitschke, 1835
Catocala nymphaea (Esper, 1787)
Catocala nymphagoga (Esper, 1787)
Catocala promissa (Denis & Schiffermuller, 1775)
Catocala separata Freyer, 1848
Clytie syriaca (Bugnion, 1837)
Coscinia cribraria (Linnaeus, 1758)
Coscinia striata (Linnaeus, 1758)
Drasteria cailino (Lefebvre, 1827)
Dysauxes famula (Freyer, 1836)
Dysgonia algira (Linnaeus, 1767)
Dysgonia torrida (Guenee, 1852)
Eilema complana (Linnaeus, 1758)
Eilema muscula (Staudinger, 1899)
Eublemma candidana (Fabricius, 1794)
Eublemma cochylioides (Guenee, 1852)
Eublemma gratissima (Staudinger, 1892)
Eublemma ostrina (Hübner, 1808)
Eublemma pallidula (Herrich-Schäffer, 1856)
Eublemma parva (Hübner, 1808)
Eublemma polygramma (Duponchel, 1842)
Eublemma scitula Rambur, 1833
Eublemma straminea (Staudinger, 1892)
Eublemma suppura (Staudinger, 1892)
Euplagia quadripunctaria (Poda, 1761)
Euproctis chrysorrhoea (Linnaeus, 1758)
Grammodes bifasciata (Petagna, 1787)
Grammodes stolida (Fabricius, 1775)
Heteropalpia vetusta (Walker, 1865)
Hypena lividalis (Hübner, 1796)
Hypena obsitalis (Hübner, 1813)
Hypenodes cypriaca Fibiger, Pekarsky & Ronkay, 2010
Lygephila craccae (Denis & Schiffermuller, 1775)
Lymantria atlantica (Rambur, 1837)
Metachrostis dardouini (Boisduval, 1840)
Metachrostis velocior (Staudinger, 1892)
Metachrostis velox (Hübner, 1813)
Micronoctua karsholti Fibiger, 1997
Minucia lunaris (Denis & Schiffermuller, 1775)
Ocnogyna loewii (Zeller, 1846)
Ophiusa tirhaca (Cramer, 1773)
Orectis proboscidata (Herrich-Schäffer, 1851)
Orgyia josephina Astaut, 1880
Orgyia trigotephras Boisduval, 1829
Pandesma robusta (Walker, 1858)
Parascotia detersa (Staudinger, 1891)
Parascotia fuliginaria (Linnaeus, 1761)
Parocneria terebinthi (Freyer, 1838)
Pericyma albidentaria (Freyer, 1842)
Pericyma squalens Lederer, 1855
Raparna conicephala (Staudinger, 1870)
Rhypagla lacernaria (Hübner, 1813)
Tathorhynchus exsiccata (Lederer, 1855)
Utetheisa pulchella (Linnaeus, 1758)
Zanclognatha lunalis (Scopoli, 1763)
Zanclognatha zelleralis (Wocke, 1850)
Zebeeba falsalis (Herrich-Schäffer, 1839)
Zekelita ravalis (Herrich-Schäffer, 1851)
Zekelita antiqualis (Hübner, 1809)
Zethes insularis Rambur, 1833

Eriocottidae
Deuterotinea instabilis (Meyrick, 1924)

Euteliidae
Eutelia adulatrix (Hübner, 1813)

Gelechiidae
Altenia mersinella (Staudinger, 1879)
Altenia wagneriella (Rebel, 1926)
Anacampsis obscurella (Denis & Schiffermuller, 1775)
Anacampsis timidella (Wocke, 1887)
Anarsia lineatella Zeller, 1839
Aristotelia calastomella (Christoph, 1873)
Aristotelia decurtella (Hübner, 1813)
Bryotropha arabica Amsel, 1952
Bryotropha azovica Bidzilia, 1997
Bryotropha desertella (Douglas, 1850)
Bryotropha domestica (Haworth, 1828)
Bryotropha figulella (Staudinger, 1859)
Bryotropha hendrikseni Karsholt & Rutten, 2005
Bryotropha hulli Karsholt & Rutten, 2005
Bryotropha plebejella (Zeller, 1847)
Bryotropha sabulosella (Rebel, 1905)
Bryotropha senectella (Zeller, 1839)
Carpatolechia decorella (Haworth, 1812)
Caryocolum marmorea (Haworth, 1828)
Crossobela trinotella (Herrich-Schäffer, 1856)
Deltophora maculata (Staudinger, 1879)
Dichomeris acuminatus (Staudinger, 1876)
Dichomeris lamprostoma (Zeller, 1847)
Dichomeris limbipunctellus (Staudinger, 1859)
Ephysteris deserticolella (Staudinger, 1871)
Ephysteris promptella (Staudinger, 1859)
Ephysteris tenuisaccus Nupponen, 2010
Epidola stigma Staudinger, 1859
Eulamprotes isostacta (Meyrick, 1926)
Eulamprotes nigromaculella (Milliere, 1872)
Exoteleia dodecella (Linnaeus, 1758)
Gelechia senticetella (Staudinger, 1859)
Isophrictis anthemidella (Wocke, 1871)
Istrianis femoralis (Staudinger, 1876)
Mesophleps corsicella Herrich-Schäffer, 1856
Mesophleps oxycedrella (Milliere, 1871)
Mesophleps silacella (Hübner, 1796)
Metanarsia modesta Staudinger, 1871
Metzneria aestivella (Zeller, 1839)
Metzneria agraphella (Ragonot, 1895)
Metzneria campicolella (Mann, 1857)
Metzneria castiliella (Moschler, 1866)
Metzneria lappella (Linnaeus, 1758)
Metzneria littorella (Douglas, 1850)
Metzneria riadella Englert, 1974
Metzneria torosulella (Rebel, 1893)
Microlechia rhamnifoliae (Amsel & Hering, 1931)
Mirificarma eburnella (Denis & Schiffermuller, 1775)
Mirificarma flavella (Duponchel, 1844)
Mirificarma mulinella (Zeller, 1839)
Monochroa melagonella (Constant, 1895)
Neotelphusa cisti (Stainton, 1869)
Nothris verbascella (Denis & Schiffermuller, 1775)
Ochrodia subdiminutella (Stainton, 1867)
Oecocecis guyonella Guenee, 1870
Ornativalva heluanensis (Debski, 1913)
Ornativalva plutelliformis (Staudinger, 1859)
Palumbina guerinii (Stainton, 1858)
Parapodia sinaica (Frauenfeld, 1859)
Pectinophora gossypiella (Saunders, 1844)
Phthorimaea operculella (Zeller, 1873)
Platyedra subcinerea (Haworth, 1828)
Ptocheuusa minimella (Rebel, 1936)
Ptocheuusa paupella (Zeller, 1847)
Recurvaria nanella (Denis & Schiffermuller, 1775)
Schneidereria pistaciella Weber, 1957
Scrobipalpa aptatella (Walker, 1864)
Scrobipalpa bigoti Povolny, 1973
Scrobipalpa instabilella (Douglas, 1846)
Scrobipalpa ocellatella (Boyd, 1858)
Scrobipalpa suaedella (Richardson, 1893)
Scrobipalpa wiltshirei Povolny, 1966
Sitotroga cerealella (Olivier, 1789)
Stomopteryx basalis (Staudinger, 1876)
Stomopteryx remissella (Zeller, 1847)

Geometridae
Agriopis bajaria (Denis & Schiffermuller, 1775)
Aplasta ononaria (Fuessly, 1783)
Aplocera plagiata (Linnaeus, 1758)
Apochima flabellaria (Heeger, 1838)
Ascotis selenaria (Denis & Schiffermuller, 1775)
Aspitates ochrearia (Rossi, 1794)
Camptogramma bilineata (Linnaeus, 1758)
Casilda consecraria (Staudinger, 1871)
Catarhoe hortulanaria (Staudinger, 1879)
Catarhoe permixtaria (Herrich-Schäffer, 1856)
Charissa subtaurica (Wehrli, 1932)
Chesias rhegmatica Prout, 1937
Chiasmia aestimaria (Hübner, 1809)
Chiasmia syriacaria (Staudinger, 1871)
Coenotephria ablutaria (Boisduval, 1840)
Colotois pennaria (Linnaeus, 1761)
Crocallis cypriaca Fischer, 2003
Culpinia prouti (Thierry-Mieg, 1913)
Cyclophora puppillaria (Hübner, 1799)
Dasycorsa modesta (Staudinger, 1879)
Dyscia innocentaria (Christoph, 1885)
Dyscia simplicaria Rebel, 1933
Ennomos lissochila (Prout, 1929)
Epirrhoe galiata (Denis & Schiffermuller, 1775)
Eumannia arenbergeri Hausmann, 1995
Eumera mulier Prout, 1929
Eupithecia breviculata (Donzel, 1837)
Eupithecia centaureata (Denis & Schiffermuller, 1775)
Eupithecia cerussaria (Lederer, 1855)
Eupithecia dubiosa Dietze, 1910
Eupithecia ericeata (Rambur, 1833)
Eupithecia marginata Staudinger, 1892
Eupithecia quercetica Prout, 1938
Eupithecia reisserata Pinker, 1976
Gnopharmia stevenaria (Boisduval, 1840)
Gnophos sartata Treitschke, 1827
Gymnoscelis rufifasciata (Haworth, 1809)
Hypomecis punctinalis (Scopoli, 1763)
Idaea albitorquata (Pungeler, 1909)
Idaea camparia (Herrich-Schäffer, 1852)
Idaea completa (Staudinger, 1892)
Idaea consanguinaria (Lederer, 1853)
Idaea consolidata (Lederer, 1853)
Idaea degeneraria (Hübner, 1799)
Idaea dimidiata (Hufnagel, 1767)
Idaea distinctaria (Boisduval, 1840)
Idaea elongaria (Rambur, 1833)
Idaea filicata (Hübner, 1799)
Idaea inclinata (Lederer, 1855)
Idaea inquinata (Scopoli, 1763)
Idaea intermedia (Staudinger, 1879)
Idaea mimosaria (Guenee, 1858)
Idaea obsoletaria (Rambur, 1833)
Idaea ochrata (Scopoli, 1763)
Idaea ostrinaria (Hübner, 1813)
Idaea palaestinensis (Sterneck, 1933)
Idaea peluraria (Reisser, 1939)
Idaea politaria (Hübner, 1799)
Idaea seriata (Schrank, 1802)
Idaea subsericeata (Haworth, 1809)
Idaea textaria (Lederer, 1861)
Idaea tineata (Thierry-Mieg, 1911)
Idaea trigeminata (Haworth, 1809)
Idaea troglodytaria (Heydenreich, 1851)
Isturgia berytaria (Staudinger, 1892)
Larentia clavaria (Haworth, 1809)
Mattia adlata (Staudinger, 1895)
Menophra berenicidaria (Turati, 1924)
Microloxia herbaria (Hübner, 1813)
Nebula achromaria (de La Harpe, 1853)
Nebula schneideraria (Lederer, 1855)
Nychiodes aphrodite Hausmann & Wimmer, 1994
Nycterosea obstipata (Fabricius, 1794)
Orthostixis cinerea Rebel, 1916
Oulobophora externaria (Herrich-Schäffer, 1848)
Pareulype lasithiotica (Rebel, 1906)
Peribatodes correptaria (Zeller, 1847)
Peribatodes rhomboidaria (Denis & Schiffermuller, 1775)
Peribatodes umbraria (Hübner, 1809)
Perizoma bifaciata (Haworth, 1809)
Phaiogramma etruscaria (Zeller, 1849)
Phaiogramma faustinata (Milliere, 1868)
Problepsis ocellata (Frivaldszky, 1845)
Proteuchloris neriaria (Herrich-Schäffer, 1852)
Protorhoe corollaria (Herrich-Schäffer, 1848)
Protorhoe unicata (Guenee, 1858)
Pseudoterpna coronillaria (Hübner, 1817)
Pseudoterpna rectistrigaria Wiltshire, 1948
Rhodometra sacraria (Linnaeus, 1767)
Rhodostrophia tabidaria (Zeller, 1847)
Rhoptria asperaria (Hübner, 1817)
Scopula decolor (Staudinger, 1898)
Scopula flaccidaria (Zeller, 1852)
Scopula imitaria (Hübner, 1799)
Scopula luridata (Zeller, 1847)
Scopula marginepunctata (Goeze, 1781)
Scopula minorata (Boisduval, 1833)
Scopula sacraria (Bang-Haas, 1910)
Scopula uberaria Zerny, 1933
Scopula ornata (Scopoli, 1763)
Scopula submutata (Treitschke, 1828)
Scopula turbulentaria (Staudinger, 1870)
Scopula vigilata (Sohn-Rethel, 1929)
Selidosema tamsi Rebel, 1939
Xanthorhoe fluctuata (Linnaeus, 1758)
Xanthorhoe oxybiata (Milliere, 1872)
Xenochlorodes olympiaria (Herrich-Schäffer, 1852)

Glyphipterigidae
Digitivalva pulicariae (Klimesch, 1956)

Gracillariidae
Caloptilia falconipennella (Hübner, 1813)
Caloptilia roscipennella (Hübner, 1796)
Parornix acuta Triberti, 1980
Phyllonorycter blancardella (Fabricius, 1781)
Phyllonorycter helianthemella (Herrich-Schäffer, 1861)
Phyllonorycter obtusifoliella Deschka, 1974
Phyllonorycter platani (Staudinger, 1870)
Phyllonorycter roboris (Zeller, 1839)
Phyllonorycter troodi Deschka, 1974
Polymitia eximipalpella (Gerasimov, 1930)
Stomphastis conflua (Meyrick, 1914)

Lasiocampidae
Chondrostega pastrana Lederer, 1858
Lasiocampa terreni (Herrich-Schäffer, 1847)

Limacodidae
Hoyosia cretica (Rebel, 1906)

Micropterigidae
Micropterix cypriensis Heath, 1985

Momphidae
Mompha miscella (Denis & Schiffermuller, 1775)

Nepticulidae
Acalyptris pistaciae van Nieukerken, 2007
Acalyptris platani (Muller-Rutz, 1934)
Ectoedemia alnifoliae van Nieukerken, 1985
Ectoedemia erythrogenella (de Joannis, 1908)
Ectoedemia heringella (Mariani, 1939)
Ectoedemia vivesi A.Lastuvka, Z. Lastuvka & van Nieukerken, 2010
Simplimorpha promissa (Staudinger, 1871)
Stigmella auromarginella (Richardson, 1890)
Stigmella azaroli (Klimesch, 1978)
Stigmella pyrellicola (Klimesch, 1978)
Stigmella pyrivora Gustafsson, 1981
Stigmella rhamnophila (Amsel, 1934)
Trifurcula rosmarinella (Chretien, 1914)

Noctuidae
Acontia lucida (Hufnagel, 1766)
Acontia trabealis (Scopoli, 1763)
Acrapex taurica (Staudinger, 1900)
Acronicta aceris (Linnaeus, 1758)
Acronicta tridens (Denis & Schiffermuller, 1775)
Acronicta rumicis (Linnaeus, 1758)
Aedia leucomelas (Linnaeus, 1758)
Aegle semicana (Esper, 1798)
Agrochola lychnidis (Denis & Schiffermuller, 1775)
Agrochola orientalis Fibiger, 1997
Agrotis bigramma (Esper, 1790)
Agrotis catalaunensis (Milliere, 1873)
Agrotis herzogi Rebel, 1911
Agrotis ipsilon (Hufnagel, 1766)
Agrotis lasserrei (Oberthur, 1881)
Agrotis puta (Hübner, 1803)
Agrotis segetum (Denis & Schiffermuller, 1775)
Agrotis spinifera (Hübner, 1808)
Agrotis trux (Hübner, 1824)
Allophyes asiatica (Staudinger, 1892)
Amephana dalmatica (Rebel, 1919)
Ammoconia aholai Fibiger, 1996
Amphipyra effusa Boisduval, 1828
Amphipyra micans Lederer, 1857
Amphipyra tragopoginis (Clerck, 1759)
Anarta dianthi (Tauscher, 1809)
Anarta trifolii (Hufnagel, 1766)
Anthracia eriopoda (Herrich-Schäffer, 1851)
Apamea monoglypha (Hufnagel, 1766)
Apamea sicula (Turati, 1909)
Aporophyla australis (Boisduval, 1829)
Aporophyla nigra (Haworth, 1809)
Atethmia ambusta (Denis & Schiffermuller, 1775)
Atethmia centrago (Haworth, 1809)
Autographa gamma (Linnaeus, 1758)
Bryophila gea (Schawerda, 1934)
Bryophila microphysa (Boursin, 1952)
Bryophila raptricula (Denis & Schiffermuller, 1775)
Bryophila rectilinea (Warren, 1909)
Bryophila tephrocharis (Boursin, 1953)
Bryophila petrea Guenee, 1852
Bryophila maeonis Lederer, 1865
Callopistria latreillei (Duponchel, 1827)
Caradrina syriaca Staudinger, 1892
Caradrina atriluna Guenee, 1852
Caradrina clavipalpis Scopoli, 1763
Caradrina flavirena Guenee, 1852
Caradrina zandi Wiltshire, 1952
Caradrina aspersa Rambur, 1834
Caradrina kadenii Freyer, 1836
Cardepia affinis (Rothschild, 1913)
Chloantha hyperici (Denis & Schiffermuller, 1775)
Chrysodeixis chalcites (Esper, 1789)
Condica viscosa (Freyer, 1831)
Conistra rubricans Fibiger, 1987
Cornutiplusia circumflexa (Linnaeus, 1767)
Craniophora ligustri (Denis & Schiffermuller, 1775)
Cryphia receptricula (Hübner, 1803)
Cryphia algae (Fabricius, 1775)
Cryphia ochsi (Boursin, 1940)
Ctenoplusia accentifera (Lefebvre, 1827)
Cucullia celsiae Herrich-Schäffer, 1850
Cucullia calendulae Treitschke, 1835
Cucullia syrtana Mabille, 1888
Cucullia barthae Boursin, 1933
Cucullia lanceolata (Villers, 1789)
Deltote pygarga (Hufnagel, 1766)
Dichagyris flammatra (Denis & Schiffermuller, 1775)
Dichagyris adelfi Fibiger, Nilsson & Svendsen, 1999
Dichagyris endemica Fibiger, Svendsen & Nilsson, 1999
Dichagyris squalorum (Eversmann, 1856)
Divaena haywardi (Tams, 1926)
Dryobota labecula (Esper, 1788)
Dryobotodes servadeii Parenzan, 1982
Egira anatolica (M. Hering, 1933)
Epilecta linogrisea (Denis & Schiffermuller, 1775)
Episema korsakovi (Christoph, 1885)
Episema kourion Nilsson, Svendsen & Fibiger, 1999
Eremohadena chenopodiphaga (Rambur, 1832)
Euxoa conspicua (Hübner, 1824)
Euxoa cos (Hübner, 1824)
Euxoa hemispherica Hampson, 1903
Hadena perplexa (Denis & Schiffermuller, 1775)
Hadena sancta (Staudinger, 1859)
Hadena syriaca (Osthelder, 1933)
Hadena adriana (Schawerda, 1921)
Hadena silenides (Staudinger, 1895)
Hecatera bicolorata (Hufnagel, 1766)
Hecatera cappa (Hübner, 1809)
Hecatera dysodea (Denis & Schiffermuller, 1775)
Helicoverpa armigera (Hübner, 1808)
Heliothis nubigera Herrich-Schäffer, 1851
Heliothis peltigera (Denis & Schiffermuller, 1775)
Hoplodrina ambigua (Denis & Schiffermuller, 1775)
Lenisa geminipuncta (Haworth, 1809)
Lenisa wiltshirei (Bytinski-Salz, 1936)
Leucania loreyi (Duponchel, 1827)
Leucania herrichi Herrich-Schäffer, 1849
Leucania palaestinae Staudinger, 1897
Leucania punctosa (Treitschke, 1825)
Leucania putrescens (Hübner, 1824)
Leucochlaena muscosa (Staudinger, 1892)
Lithophane ledereri (Staudinger, 1892)
Lithophane merckii (Rambur, 1832)
Lithophane lapidea (Hübner, 1808)
Luperina diversa (Staudinger, 1892)
Luperina dumerilii (Duponchel, 1826)
Mamestra brassicae (Linnaeus, 1758)
Melanchra persicariae (Linnaeus, 1761)
Mesapamea secalis (Linnaeus, 1758)
Metopoceras omar (Oberthur, 1887)
Mormo maura (Linnaeus, 1758)
Mythimna congrua (Hübner, 1817)
Mythimna ferrago (Fabricius, 1787)
Mythimna l-album (Linnaeus, 1767)
Mythimna languida (Walker, 1858)
Mythimna vitellina (Hübner, 1808)
Mythimna unipuncta (Haworth, 1809)
Mythimna alopecuri (Boisduval, 1840)
Mythimna sicula (Treitschke, 1835)
Noctua orbona (Hufnagel, 1766)
Noctua pronuba (Linnaeus, 1758)
Noctua tertia Mentzer & al., 1991
Noctua warreni Lodl, 1987
Nyctobrya amasina Draudt, 1931
Ochropleura leucogaster (Freyer, 1831)
Olivenebula subsericata (Herrich-Schäffer, 1861)
Oncocnemis arenbergi Hacker & Lodl, 1989
Orthosia cruda (Denis & Schiffermuller, 1775)
Orthosia cypriaca Hacker, 1996
Orthosia incerta (Hufnagel, 1766)
Peridroma saucia (Hübner, 1808)
Perigrapha wimmeri Hacker, 1996
Polymixis alaschia Hacker, 1996
Polymixis aphrodite Fibiger, 1987
Polymixis trisignata (Menetries, 1847)
Polymixis ancepsoides Poole, 1989
Polymixis manisadijani (Staudinger, 1881)
Polymixis rufocincta (Geyer, 1828)
Polymixis iatnana Hacker, 1996
Pseudenargia troodosi Svendsen, Nilsson & Fibiger, 1999
Rhyacia arenacea (Hampson, 1907)
Sesamia cretica Lederer, 1857
Sesamia nonagrioides Lefebvre, 1827
Spodoptera cilium Guenee, 1852
Spodoptera exigua (Hübner, 1808)
Spodoptera littoralis (Boisduval, 1833)
Standfussiana lucernea (Linnaeus, 1758)
Standfussiana nictymera (Boisduval, 1834)
Subacronicta megacephala (Denis & Schiffermuller, 1775)
Thysanoplusia circumscripta (Freyer, 1831)
Thysanoplusia daubei (Boisduval, 1840)
Thysanoplusia orichalcea (Fabricius, 1775)
Tiliacea cypreago (Hampson, 1906)
Trichoplusia ni (Hübner, 1803)
Trigonophora flammea (Esper, 1785)
Tyta luctuosa (Denis & Schiffermuller, 1775)
Xestia c-nigrum (Linnaeus, 1758)
Xestia cohaesa (Herrich-Schäffer, 1849)
Xestia palaestinensis (Kalchberg, 1897)
Xestia xanthographa (Denis & Schiffermuller, 1775)
Xylena exsoleta (Linnaeus, 1758)
Xylena vetusta (Hübner, 1813)

Nolidae
Earias clorana (Linnaeus, 1761)
Earias insulana (Boisduval, 1833)
Meganola togatulalis (Hübner, 1796)
Nola aegyptiaca Snellen, 1875
Nola chlamitulalis (Hübner, 1813)
Nycteola columbana (Turner, 1925)
Nycteola revayana (Scopoli, 1772)

Notodontidae
Furcula interrupta (Christoph, 1867)
Harpyia milhauseri (Fabricius, 1775)
Phalera bucephaloides (Ochsenheimer, 1810)
Thaumetopoea processionea (Linnaeus, 1758)
Thaumetopoea solitaria (Freyer, 1838)
Thaumetopoea wilkinsoni Tams, 1926

Oecophoridae
Crossotocera wagnerella Zerny, 1930
Denisia augustella (Hübner, 1796)
Epicallima formosella (Denis & Schiffermuller, 1775)
Epicallima icterinella (Mann, 1867)
Pleurota pyropella (Denis & Schiffermuller, 1775)
Schiffermuelleria schaefferella (Linnaeus, 1758)

Peleopodidae
Carcina quercana (Fabricius, 1775)

Plutellidae
Plutella xylostella (Linnaeus, 1758)

Praydidae
Prays oleae (Bernard, 1788)

Psychidae
Apterona helicoidella (Vallot, 1827)
Eumasia parietariella (Heydenreich, 1851)
Pachythelia villosella (Ochsenheimer, 1810)
Pseudobankesia aphroditae Weidlich,M.,Henderickx,H., 2002

Pterophoridae
Agdistis cypriota Arenberger, 1983
Agdistis frankeniae (Zeller, 1847)
Agdistis heydeni (Zeller, 1852)
Agdistis meridionalis (Zeller, 1847)
Agdistis nigra Amsel, 1955
Agdistis protai Arenberger, 1973
Agdistis tamaricis (Zeller, 1847)
Amblyptilia acanthadactyla (Hübner, 1813)
Capperia celeusi (Frey, 1886)
Capperia maratonica Adamczewski, 1951
Capperia marginellus (Zeller, 1847)
Cnaemidophorus rhododactyla (Denis & Schiffermuller, 1775)
Crombrugghia distans (Zeller, 1847)
Crombrugghia reichli Arenberger, 1998
Emmelina monodactyla (Linnaeus, 1758)
Hellinsia inulae (Zeller, 1852)
Hellinsia pectodactylus (Staudinger, 1859)
Merrifieldia malacodactylus (Zeller, 1847)
Puerphorus olbiadactylus (Milliere, 1859)
Stangeia siceliota (Zeller, 1847)
Stenoptilia bipunctidactyla (Scopoli, 1763)
Stenoptilia elkefi Arenberger, 1984
Stenoptilia lucasi Arenberger, 1990
Stenoptilia zophodactylus (Duponchel, 1840)
Stenoptilodes taprobanes (Felder & Rogenhofer, 1875)
Tabulaephorus punctinervis (Constant, 1885)
Wheeleria ivae (Kasy, 1960)
Wheeleria obsoletus (Zeller, 1841)

Pyralidae
Acrobasis getuliella (Zerny, 1914)
Aglossa asiatica Erschoff, 1872
Aglossa exsucealis Lederer, 1863
Ancylosis biflexella (Lederer, 1855)
Ancylosis convexella (Lederer, 1855)
Ancylosis monella (Roesler, 1973)
Ancylosis rhodochrella (Herrich-Schäffer, 1852)
Ancylosis yerburii (Butler, 1884)
Cadra cautella (Walker, 1863)
Cadra figulilella (Gregson, 1871)
Dioryctria mendacella (Staudinger, 1859)
Ephestia elutella (Hübner, 1796)
Ephestia kuehniella Zeller, 1879
Epicrocis anthracanthes Meyrick, 1934
Eurhodope cinerea (Staudinger, 1879)
Euzophera cinerosella (Zeller, 1839)
Euzophera osseatella (Treitschke, 1832)
Euzophera paghmanicola Roesler, 1973
Euzophera umbrosella (Staudinger, 1879)
Faveria sordida (Staudinger, 1879)
Homoeosoma candefactella Ragonot, 1887
Homoeosoma sinuella (Fabricius, 1794)
Hypotia mavromoustakisi (Rebel, 1928)
Hypsopygia almanalis (Rebel, 1917)
Keradere noctivaga (Staudinger, 1879)
Lamoria melanophlebia Ragonot, 1888
Metallostichodes nigrocyanella (Constant, 1865)
Myelois ossicolor Ragonot, 1893
Pempelia albicostella Amsel, 1958
Pempelia cirtensis (Ragonot, 1890)
Phycitodes albatella (Ragonot, 1887)
Phycitodes binaevella (Hübner, 1813)
Phycitodes inquinatella (Ragonot, 1887)
Phycitodes saxicola (Vaughan, 1870)
Pyralis kacheticalis (Christoph, 1893)
Scotomera caesarealis (Ragonot, 1891)

Saturniidae
Saturnia caecigena Kupido, 1825

Scythrididae
Scythris punctivittella (O. Costa, 1836)

Sesiidae
Bembecia albanensis (Rebel, 1918)
Bembecia stiziformis (Herrich-Schäffer, 1851)
Chamaesphecia alysoniformis (Herrich-Schäffer, 1846)
Chamaesphecia masariformis (Ochsenheimer, 1808)
Chamaesphecia minor (Staudinger, 1856)
Chamaesphecia proximata (Staudinger, 1891)
Paranthrene tabaniformis (Rottemburg, 1775)
Pyropteron affinis (Staudinger, 1856)
Pyropteron leucomelaena (Zeller, 1847)
Pyropteron minianiformis (Freyer, 1843)
Synanthedon myopaeformis (Borkhausen, 1789)

Sphingidae
Acherontia atropos (Linnaeus, 1758)
Agrius convolvuli (Linnaeus, 1758)
Clarina syriaca (Lederer, 1855)
Daphnis nerii (Linnaeus, 1758)
Hippotion celerio (Linnaeus, 1758)
Hyles euphorbiae (Linnaeus, 1758)
Hyles livornica (Esper, 1780)
Macroglossum stellatarum (Linnaeus, 1758)
Smerinthus kindermannii Lederer, 1857
Theretra alecto (Linnaeus, 1758)

Stathmopodidae
Neomariania partinicensis (Rebel, 1937)
Tortilia graeca Kasy, 1981

Tineidae
Ateliotum arenbergeri Petersen & Gaedike, 1985
Cephimallota angusticostella (Zeller, 1839)
Edosa fuscoviolacella (Ragonot, 1895)
Eudarcia lobata (Petersen & Gaedike, 1979)
Eudarcia echinatum (Petersen & Gaedike, 1985)
Eudarcia holtzi (Rebel, 1902)
Hapsifera luridella Zeller, 1847
Infurcitinea cyprica Petersen & Gaedike, 1985
Infurcitinea frustigerella (Walsingham, 1907)
Infurcitinea graeca Gaedike, 1983
Infurcitinea nedae Gaedike, 1983
Infurcitinea nigropluviella (Walsingham, 1907)
Monopis imella (Hübner, 1813)
Morophaga morella (Duponchel, 1838)
Myrmecozela parnassiella (Rebel, 1915)
Myrmecozela stepicola Zagulajev, 1972
Nemapogon cyprica Gaedike, 1986
Nemapogon orientalis Petersen, 1961
Nemapogon signatellus Petersen, 1957
Neurothaumasia ankerella (Mann, 1867)
Neurothaumasia macedonica Petersen, 1962
Niditinea fuscella (Linnaeus, 1758)
Niditinea tugurialis (Meyrick, 1932)
Praeacedes atomosella (Walker, 1863)
Tinea murariella Staudinger, 1859
Tinea translucens Meyrick, 1917
Trichophaga tapetzella (Linnaeus, 1758)

Tischeriidae
Coptotriche marginea (Haworth, 1828)

Tortricidae
Acleris undulana (Walsingham, 1900)
Acleris variegana (Denis & Schiffermuller, 1775)
Aethes bilbaensis (Rossler, 1877)
Aethes francillana (Fabricius, 1794)
Aethes kasyi Razowski, 1962
Aethes mauritanica (Walsingham, 1898)
Bactra lancealana (Hübner, 1799)
Bactra venosana (Zeller, 1847)
Cacoecimorpha pronubana (Hübner, 1799)
Celypha rufana (Scopoli, 1763)
Clepsis consimilana (Hübner, 1817)
Cnephasia gueneeana (Duponchel, 1836)
Cnephasia orientana (Alphéraky, 1876)
Cnephasia pumicana (Zeller, 1847)
Cnephasia tofina Meyrick, 1922
Cochylidia heydeniana (Herrich-Schäffer, 1851)
Cochylimorpha alternana (Stephens, 1834)
Cochylimorpha straminea (Haworth, 1811)
Cochylis molliculana Zeller, 1847
Cochylis posterana Zeller, 1847
Crocidosema plebejana Zeller, 1847
Cydia amplana (Hübner, 1800)
Cydia fagiglandana (Zeller, 1841)
Cydia microgrammana (Guenee, 1845)
Cydia pomonella (Linnaeus, 1758)
Cydia splendana (Hübner, 1799)
Cydia trogodana Prose, 1988
Endothenia gentianaeana (Hübner, 1799)
Eucosma campoliliana (Denis & Schiffermuller, 1775)
Grapholita funebrana Treitschke, 1835
Grapholita discretana Wocke, 1861
Grapholita lunulana (Denis & Schiffermuller, 1775)
Gypsonoma sociana (Haworth, 1811)
Hedya pruniana (Hübner, 1799)
Lobesia botrana (Denis & Schiffermuller, 1775)
Lobesia indusiana (Zeller, 1847)
Neosphaleroptera nubilana (Hübner, 1799)
Notocelia uddmanniana (Linnaeus, 1758)
Pammene crataegophila Amsel, 1935
Pammene fasciana (Linnaeus, 1761)
Pelochrista modicana (Zeller, 1847)
Phalonidia contractana (Zeller, 1847)
Phtheochroa decipiens Walsingham, 1900
Phtheochroa dodrantaria (Razowski, 1970)
Pseudococcyx tessulatana (Staudinger, 1871)
Rhyacionia buoliana (Denis & Schiffermuller, 1775)
Spilonota ocellana (Denis & Schiffermuller, 1775)
Zeiraphera isertana (Fabricius, 1794)

Yponomeutidae
Yponomeuta padella (Linnaeus, 1758)
Zelleria oleastrella (Milliere, 1864)

Ypsolophidae
Ypsolopha instabilella (Mann, 1866)
Ypsolopha persicella (Fabricius, 1787)

Zygaenidae
Jordanita graeca (Jordan, 1907)
Jordanita anatolica (Naufock, 1929)
Theresimima ampellophaga (Bayle-Barelle, 1808)

External links
Fauna Europaea

Invertebrates of Cyprus
Lepidoptera

 Cyprus
Cypruss
Cyprus
Cyprus
Cyprus
Cyprus